James McCluskey (1 November 1950 in Salsburgh – 14 November 2013) was a football referee from Scotland, who officiated in the 1991 FIFA Women's World Cup and the final of UEFA Women's Euro 1991.

A former footballer in the early 1970s before becoming an official, he refereed the 1990 Scottish League Cup Final, an Old Firm fixture in which Rangers defeated Celtic 2–1 at Hampden Park (leading a group of Celtic supporters to have him followed by a private investigator to uncover any bias towards their rivals), the 1993 Scottish Cup Final where Rangers beat Aberdeen 2–1 at Celtic Park, the 1993 Scottish League Cup Final at Celtic Park in which Rangers overcame Hibernian 2–1, and the 1994 Scottish League Cup Final won on penalties by Raith Rovers over Celtic at Ibrox Stadium. With the national cup finals being spread around those locations during the 1990s due to reconstruction work, this gave McCluskey the unique distinction of having refereed such matches at all three venues.

McCluskey also oversaw the second leg of the 1994 UEFA Cup Final between Inter Milan and Casino Salzburg, and altogether took charge of more than 50 FIFA and UEFA matches.

To celebrate his career, the Scottish Football Association awarded McCluskey a Scottish Cup Final game for his swansong. He presided over the 2000 Scottish Cup Final, in which Rangers beat Aberdeen 4–0 at Hampden.

McCluskey, who worked as a surveyor in Ayrshire in addition to refereeing, died on 14 November 2013  in Ayr, aged 63.

References

External links
Profile at World Referee
Profile at EU Football
Domestic profile ('Jim McCluskey') at World Football
International profile ('James McCluskey') at World Football

1950 births
2013 deaths
Scottish football referees
Sportspeople from Shotts
Deaths in Scotland
FIFA Women's World Cup referees
Sportspeople from East Ayrshire
Shotts Bon Accord F.C. players
Scottish footballers
Scottish Junior Football Association players
Airdrieonians F.C. (1878) players
Association footballers not categorized by position
Scottish Football League referees